The , also known simply as the , meaning 'Special Secretary', or, from the 11th century on, as the , was an official of the Byzantine Empire who controlled the department known as , a special treasury and storehouse.

History and functions 
The origin of the office is disputed: the department is first attested in the reign of Emperor Theophilos (r. 829–842), but some scholars (e.g.

The  fulfilled the dual function of imperial treasury and storehouse. As a treasury, it stored various precious materials such as silk or gold, and was responsible for the payment of the annual salaries of officials of senatorial rank. As a storehouse, the  controlled the state factories producing military equipment (the Late Roman ) and was responsible for supplying the necessary matériel for expeditions, ranging from weapons to "sails, ropes, hides, axes, wax, tin, lead, casks" for the fleet or even Arab clothing for imperial spies. For expeditions in which the emperor himself took part, the  accompanied the army at the head of his own baggage train of 46 pack-horses carrying everything "from shoes to candlesticks", as well as large sums of gold and silver coinage for the emperor's use.

Staff 
As with all Byzantine department heads, the  had a number of subordinate officials:
As their name indicates, they supervised individual state factories for silk, jewelry, weapons, etc. They are well attested in seals from the 7th century on, and from the 9th century on they are frequently called .
 The , palace servants.

It was situated between the great halls of the Triconchos and the Lausiakos, near the imperial audience hall of the Chrysotriklinos.

References

Sources

 

Byzantine fiscal offices
Byzantine military equipment
Military logistics